New York State Route 3E may refer to:

New York State Route 3E (1930–1932) in Wayne, Cayuga, and western Oswego Counties
New York State Route 3E (1932–1935) in central Oswego County